Irène Major (born 22 October 1979) is a British-Cameroonian singer, model and activist.

Personal life 

Irène Major was born in Yaoundé, Cameroon to a soldier father and seamstress mother; the family was "middle-class but poor". Growing up, she lived in various locations in Cameroon due to her father's military postings.

Irène is married to oil and gas tycoon Sam Malin who is of dual Canadian and British citizenship. She has eight children. She is currently based in the UK, although she was previously based in Paris. She holds the Scottish feudal courtesy title of Lady Hailes (her husband being Lord Hailes), these being attached to their purchase of a "13th century ruined castle in Scotland".

In 2012, they purchased Ingress Abbey, subsequently converted for use as a family home.

The European Communication School (ECS) awarded to Irène an Honorary Degree of Master in Communication in 2017.

Career 

In Cameroon, Irène was a regular feature of the catwalk (she was Miss Lions Cameroon 1995), an occasional radio presenter and had parts in various films. From Cameroon, she moved first to Paris, France and then to the United Kingdom.

Internationally, Irène has worked as a model and in film, TV shows, music videos and commercials, with roles credited and uncredited. She has appeared in Die Another Day, Ali G Indahouse, World of Our Own – Westlife, Black Betty by Tom Jones, as the presenter of Ess'mode par Irene Major, a guest judge on The One, and as an on-screen hostess on the V Graham Norton show. In 2015, she appeared in  Britain's Flashiest Families, in 2016, in Shock Docs: Britain's Pushiest Parents and Too Posh To Parent, and in 2017, Billionaire Babies: 24 Carat Kids. Irène is the model for a display mannequin in the Drama Diva collection by Rootstein.

Philanthropy and Causes

Irène Major is involved with various philanthropic and human rights causes. In 2008, she founded IM Life, a charity with a focus on sub-Saharan Africa and the western Indian Ocean, to provide support, including food, shelter, training and logistics support, to those in desperate need. She is also  the founder of the Gay in Africa Foundation, a campaign which exists to boost awareness of the persecution and suffering of the African LGBT community and fight against homophobia and discrimination against the LGBT in Africa.

Irène is an ambassador for International Harbor, a charity founded by former US special operations veterans dedicated to eliminating human trafficking and abduction through advocacy and action
 and works with other charities including African Revival and several organisations combatting FGM in sub-Saharan Africa.

Major

Irène set up the pop group Major in 2012 with her sister Elsa. They have released a number of songs and videos:

Love Me Boy (written by Pete Kirtley)
Romeo (written by Pete Bellotte and Sylvester Levay, original performer: Donna Summer)
Birds (written by Irene Major)
Cannes Cannes Cannes (written by Pete Hammond and Jeff Chegwin)
Umqombothi - African Heroes (original version written by Sello "Chicco" Twala and Attie van Wyk and performed by Yvonne Chaka Chaka)

Major toured the UK in 2013 and, in 2014, Major participated in The X Factor (UK series 11) and made it through to the final 28 contestants (the six-seat challenge at bootcamp) with Louis Walsh as mentor.

References

External links
Irène Major on Instagram
Irène Major on YouTube
Major (group) Facebook

1979 births
Living people
People from Centre Region (Cameroon)
English female models
People from Yaoundé